Muras may refer to:
 Muras, Galicia, a municipality in the province of Lugo, Galicia, Spain
 Muras people, an indigenous people of South America

See also
Muro (disambiguation)
Muros (disambiguation)